This is a list of records  and statistics of the Copa América, including everything from when it was called the South American Football Championship (1916–1975).

Debut of national teams

Overall team records

In this ranking 3 points are awarded for a win, 1 for a draw and 0 for a loss. As per statistical convention in football, matches decided in extra time are counted as wins and losses, while matches decided by penalty shoot-outs are counted as draws. Teams are ranked by total points, then by goal difference, then by goals scored.

Medal table
No third place match was played in 1975, 1979 and 1983.

General statistics by tournament 

Note: Carlos Valderrama (1987) was the first player to officially win the best player of the tournament award.

Hosts

Coaches with most games

Teams

Overall
Most Copa América appearances: 45, 
 For a detailed list, see Copa América participations
Most championships: 15, 
Most appearances in a Copa América final: 29, 
Most appearances in Copa América semi-finals: 36, 
 For a detailed list of top four appearances, see Copa América results
Most matches played: 206, 
Fewest matches played: 3, 
Most wins: 124, 
Most losses: 87, 
Most draws: 41, 
Team with the most goals scored in a single match:  12-0 
Most goals scored: 465, 
Most goals conceded: 323, 
Fewest goals scored: 0, 
Fewest goals conceded: 5, 
Highest average of goals scored per match: 2.35, 
Lowest average of goals conceded per match: 0.83,

In one tournament
Most wins: 7,  (1949)
Most goals scored: 46,  (1949)
Fewest goals conceded: 0,  (2001)
Most goals conceded: 34
Most minutes without conceding a goal: 1,009

Streaks
Most consecutive championships: 3,  1945, 1946, 1947
Most consecutive final matches: 7,  1923–1937
Most consecutive runners-up:
2,  (4 times)
2,  (2 times)
2, 
2,

Individual

Goals scored

Matches played

Titles by player

Individual records
Most goals scored in a single tournament: 9 –  Jair (1949),  Humberto Maschio (1957) and  Javier Ambrois (1957)
Most goals scored in a single match by a player: 5 –  Héctor Scarone (1926),  Juan Marvezzi (1941),  José Manuel Moreno (1942) and  Evaristo (1957)
Most overall assists provided: 17 –  Lionel Messi (2007–2021)
Most assists provided in a single tournament: 5 –  Lionel Messi (2021)
Fastest goal scored: after 68 seconds –  Kily González v. Uruguay (1999)
Fastest hat-trick: after 10 minutes –  José Manuel Moreno (1942)
Most overall matches played: 34 –  Sergio Livingstone (1941–1949),  Lionel Messi (2007–2021)

List of penalty shoot-outs 

Most shoot-outs won: 5 –  (1995, 2001, 2004, 2007, 2019)
Most shoot-outs lost: 6
 (1993, 2001, 2004, 2007, 2019, 2021)
Most shoot-outs played: 10
 (1993, 1995, 1999, 1999, 2001, 2004, 2007, 2011, 2019, 2021)

Championship year in bold

By chronological order

References and footnotes

References

Footnotes

 
Records